Pierre Michon (born 28 March 1945, Châtelus-le-Marcheix, Creuse) is a French writer. His first novel, Small lives (1984), is widely regarded as a genuine masterpiece in contemporary French literature.  He has won several prizes for Small lives and for The Origin of the World (1996) as well as for his body of work. His novels and stories have been translated into German, Dutch, Italian, Spanish, Greek, Portuguese, Polish, Serbian, Czech, Norwegian, Estonian and English. He won the 2017 International Nonino Prize in Italy.

Works
 1984: Small Lives (Vies minuscules).
Translated by Jody Gladding and Elizabeth Deshays for Archipelago Books, 2008.
 1988: Life of Joseph Roulin (Vie de Joseph Roulin).Translated by Wyatt Mason for Mercury House and included in Masters and Servants, 1997.
 1997: L'empereur d'Occident.
 1990: Masters and Servants (Maîtres et serviteurs).
Translated by Wyatt Mason for Mercury House, 1997.
 1991: Rimbaud the Son (Rimbaud le fils).
Translated by Jody Gladding and Elizabeth Deshays for Yale University Press, 2013.
 1996: The Origin of the World (La Grande Beune).
Translated by Wyatt Mason for Mercury House, 2002.
 1996: The King of the Wood (Le roi du bois).
Translated by Wyatt Mason for Mercury House and included in Masters and Servants, 1997.
 1997: Trois auteurs.
 1997: Winter Mythologies (Mythologies d'hiver).
Translated by Ann Jefferson for Yale University Press, 2017.
 2002: Abbots (Abbés).
Translated by Ann Jefferson for Yale University Press, 2017.
 2002: Corps du roi.
 2007: Le roi vient quand il veut : propos sur la littérature.
 2009: The Eleven (Les Onze'').
Translated by Jody Gladding and Elizabeth Deshays for Archipelago Books, 2013.

Awards
 2002: Prix Décembre
 2009: Grand Prix du roman de l'Académie française
 2010: Petrarca-Preis
 2017: International Nonino Prize 
 2019: Franz Kafka Prize

References

External links
Pierre Michon at publisher's site (in French)
Pierre Michon at remue.net (in French)
Critical bibliography (Auteurs.contemporain.info) (in French)
Pierre Michon at Mercury House (English translations)

1945 births
Living people
People from Creuse
20th-century French non-fiction writers
21st-century French non-fiction writers
Prix Décembre winners
Grand Prix du roman de l'Académie française winners
Prix Louis Guilloux winners
20th-century French male writers